Jamai Shashthi ( English: Son-in-law day) is a 1931 Bengali short film directed by Amar Choudhury and produced by Madan Theatre Limited. It is a milestone of Bengali cinema as it was the first Bengali short film as a talkie. It was released at Crown Cinema Hall in Calcutta on 11 April 1931, in the same year as Alam Ara, the first Indian talkie.

Cast
 Professor Bholanath
 Amar Choudhury as kuber
 Miss Golela
 Khirodegopal Mukherjee
 Ranisundari as Mother in law

See also
 Alam Ara
 Dena Paona

References

External links

1931 films
1931 drama films
Bengali-language Indian films
Indian black-and-white films
Indian short films
1930s Bengali-language films
Indian drama films